Acleris lucipara is a species of moth of the family Tortricidae. It is found in India (Assam).

References

Moths described in 1964
lucipara
Moths of Asia